New Lenox is a village in central Will County, Illinois, United States. It is a southwestern suburb of Chicago and an eastern suburb of Joliet. The village population was 28,060 as of 2023. New Lenox has schools like Lincoln-Way West High School, Providence Catholic High School, and Lincoln-Way Central High School.

Geography
New Lenox is located approximately 36 miles southwest of downtown Chicago at  (41.508251, -87.970597). It is bordered by Joliet to the northwest, Ingalls Park to the west, Mokena to the east, Frankfort to the southeast and Manhattan to the south.

Climate 
The average temperatures in New Lenox range from 21 °F (-6 °C) in January to 73 °F (23 °C) in July. There are 137 days of the daily low temperature being below or at freezing (138 if its a leap). There are 86 days where the daily high is above the 80 °F (27 °C) mark.

History

What is now the Village of New Lenox was first settled in the late 1820s, in the area of Gougar crossing (Route 30 and Gougar Road) and it was called VanHorne Point. New Lenox Township was established when Will County was created in 1852 with the building of the Rock Island Railroad between Chicago and Rock Island, Illinois. Originally named Tracey in honor of the general superintendent of the Rock Island Railroad. Mr. Tracy later requested that the community be renamed.  The first supervisor of the Rock Island Railway for New Lenox Township, John Van Duser, named the Township New Lenox from the town Lenox, New York,  which was Van Duser's hometown. In 1863, the name for the new settlement officially became New Lenox Township.

The Village of New Lenox was officially created on October 4, 1946. In 1945, 46 community leaders, F. Carlton Cole, Walter Baers and others reasoned that the community should be incorporated. Recognizing the benefits and the potential growth of the area, a community vote in the spring of 1946 resulted in the authorization for the creation of the Village of New Lenox. On October 4, 1946, the State of Illinois officially certified that New Lenox was legally organized and incorporated as a Village in the State of Ill

In 1829, fur traders Aaron Friend and Joseph Brown established an outpost along the north side of  Hickory Creek, (near today’s Gougar Road) which was one of the earliest settlements in Will County.  Friend moved west with the Native Americans after the Blackhawk War of 1832. In 1830, William Rice, Sr. and William Rice, Jr.  arrived and began farming and building a log cabin, which they sold along with their land to John Gougar on behalf of his father William Gougar.  In 1832, “Uncle Billy Gougar” established a post office at his farm where area residents would pick up their mail. The Gougar farm became the center of activity in the area. 

Joseph Norman, who opened the second area sawmill in 1833,  was also the father of Elizabeth Norman, born in 1832, and was the first child born in New Lenox Township. In 1852, the coming of the Rock Island Railroad changed the settlement of the Township. Before the railroad, farmers hauled their goods to the I & M Canal or by wagon all the way to larger cities like Chicago. The railroad brought distant markets to the farmer, along with more visitors and the mail. Later three additional railroads: the Wabash, the Michigan Central, and the Elgin, Joliet and Eastern all crossed New Lenox Township. Gradually the area east of Gougar Crossing along the railroad tracks became the new center of town and so the Village of New Lenox began. 

The village was platted in 1858. The name Tracy was the name shown on the original plat to honor the general superintendent of the Rock Island Railroad. Tracy requested that another name be found. The first supervisor for New Lenox Township J. Van Duser had named the Township New Lenox from the town of Lenox, New York, which was Van Duser's home town. In 1863, the name for the new settlement officially became New Lenox after the Township. The coming of the Rock Island Railroad in 1852 changed the settlement of the Township considerably. Previously farmers could do "cash crop" farming by hauling the products to the I & M Canal or by wagon all the way to larger cities like Chicago. The presence of the railroad brought distant markets to the farmer. Eventually New Lenox Township was served by three additional railroads: the Wabash, the Michigan Central, and the Elgin, Joliet and Eastern.

The most prominent citizen of New Lenox at the turn of the century was H. N. Higinbotham. Although Mr. Higinbotham's home was located in New Lenox, he became famous in Chicago where he was a partner in Marshall Field's, a banker, and the organizing and supervising force behind the World's Columbian Exposition of 1893. He was a colleague and friend of most of Chicago's leaders, including George Pullman, Marshall Field, and the Palmers.  Mr. Higinbotham once owned the farms that later became Pilcher Park. He owned and operated one of the largest carnation and rose greenhouse businesses in this area. In 1898, the first rural Bell telephone company in Illinois came to New Lenox. By 1905, there were 132 subscribers. The switchboard operators worked in homes so that 24 hour service could be given to customers to handle emergencies. The Deadmore home at 221 Haven Avenue was the first location for the switchboard.

New Lenox is known as "The Home of Proud Americans", which exemplifies the quality of life in the community.

Demographics

As of the census of 2010, there were 24,394 people, 8,000 households, and 6,547 families residing in the village.

The racial makeup of the village was 96.2% White, 0.8% Asian, 0.7% African American, 0.2% Native American, 0.0% Pacific Islander, 1.0% from other races, and 1.1% from two or more races. Hispanic or Latino of any race were 5.7% of the population.

There were 8,000 households, out of which 45.2% had children under the age of 18 living with them, 69.8% were married couples living together, and 8.2 were non-families. 15.1% of all households were made up of individuals, and 5.7% had someone living alone who was 65 years of age or older. The average household size was 3.04 and the average family size was 3.41.

The median income for a household in the village was $88,778 and the median income for a family was $97,752

The median home value in the village as of the first quarter of 2011 is $245,100.

According to a 2011 forecast the Chicago Metropolitan Agency for Planning estimated New Lenox will have a population of 90,652 in 2030. However, due to a substantial slow down in area growth, a 2015 forecast estimates the population of New Lenox will grow to about 68,000 residents by 2040.

Local government

The village operates under the village form of local government. The Council-Trustees/Mayor form of government is followed and utilizes a village administrator to perform chief administrative duties. The current mayor is Tim Baldermann and the current village administrator is Kurt Carroll. The six member board of trustees and mayor are elected in an election at large on a four-year staggered basis, with the mayor elected to that specific office by the voters. 

The village's board of trustees is responsible for setting village policy, enacting ordinances and resolutions for the proper governing of the village, as well as for overseeing the proper planning of the village.

The current board is composed of Annette Bowden, David Butterfield, Douglas Finnegan, Jasen Howard, Keith Madsen, and David Smith.

The village clerk is an appointed position and is responsible for the proper keeping of all official documents of the village.   As well, the position is the local election official, and is responsible for in-person absentee voting, as well as the duties of setting the ballot for all local elections.  As chief administrative officer, the village administrator is responsible for the enforcement of all village codes and ordinances, as well as recommending employee hiring to the mayor and board of trustees. The village administrator also supervises all village departmental operations.

In 2007, the village governmental operations were moved to the new New Lenox Village Hall at 1 Veterans Parkway. The main level of the building which formerly housed the village operations was remodeled for police use.

Education 
Elementary and middle schools are operated by New Lenox School District 122 while Lincoln-Way Community High School District serves the communities of New Lenox, Frankfort, Mokena, Manhattan, and small portions of Tinley Park and Orland Park. There are three comprehensive high schools within the district: Lincoln-Way Central, Lincoln-Way East, and Lincoln-Way West. Lincoln-Way Central and Lincoln-Way West are located in New Lenox; Lincoln-Way East is located in Frankfort.
 
Providence Catholic High School is a private Roman Catholic secondary school located in New Lenox.
 
The United States' first public community college, Joliet Junior College, offers pre-baccalaureate programs for students planning to transfer to a four-year university.

Health care

Silver Cross has built a $400 million hospital just off of U.S. Route 6 nearby the new I-355 extension in New Lenox; replacing their Joliet location on February 26, 2012. The replacement hospital brings services from Children’s Memorial Hospital, the Rehabilitation Institute of Chicago (RIC) – the #1 Rehabilitation Hospital in the Nation, and the University of Chicago Medical Center.

Transportation

Train

New Lenox has two Metra commuter rail lines. The  New Lenox Metra Station is located on the corner of U.S. Route 30 and Cedar Road, servicing towns on Metra's Rock Island District Line between Joliet Union Station and Chicago's LaSalle Street Station.  New Lenox also has  Metra Laraway Road Station at the intersection of Cedar Road.  This rail line services towns on Metra's SouthWest Service Line between Manhattan and Chicago's Union Station.

Highways

New Lenox is located at the junctions of many major roads. U.S. Route 30 is the main East to West road through town. The North South streets are Cedar Road, Gougar Road, and Nelson Road. I-80 and I-355, also known as The Veterans Memorial Tollway, pass through New Lenox. These expressways lend to easy transportation to many other major highways and to Chicago, Joliet, Naperville, Wheaton, Bolingbrook.

Airport

New Lenox-Howell Airport is an abandoned airfield   located on Laraway Road.

Economy

The crossroads of I-355, Route 6, and Cedar Road was intended as the future site of two major development projects; Cedar Crossings and Spring Creek Outlets.  Cedar Crossings will be constructed at southwest corner of Cedar Road and Route 6, adjacent to Silver Cross Hospital.   Cedar Crossings is a proposed 970,000-square-foot retail center to be developed by the Zaremba Group.  However, development of Cedar Crossings has been delayed due to economic reasons.

Arts and entertainment

The Commons

In 2005, the village opened the Commons anchored by the Performing Arts Pavilion. The village organizes a Summer Performing Arts Program including a series of free concerts and family movie nights.  Each year the village hosts the Triple Play Concert Series featuring national recording artists performing on three different dates each summer. The 2011 Triple Play headline performers were Starship starring Mickey Thomas, Cheap Trick, and REO Speedwagon.

Outdoors

New Lenox features the Sanctuary Golf Course.  Bordering the west end of New Lenox and Joliet is Woodruff Golf Course.  Opened in 1926, Woodruff is a course with sweeping elevation changes and small greens.

The New Lenox French Market made its debut in 2011. The Market runs late spring through October and offers fresh produce and fruit, hanging baskets, perennials and potted herbs, gourmet cheeses, dips, candies and sauces, bake goods, fresh coffee and much more.  Festivals and various other events play an important role in family culture and entertainment. The Park District hosts the annual Proud American Days festival the last weekend in July. This festival includes food vendors, carnival rides, a craft show and live music. The Annual Kids Fest includes a day filled with fun activities just for kids. The Chamber’s Halloween Parade & Costume Contest features frightful fun for hundreds of area families.

During the Summer of 2011 (July 7 and 8), Lincoln-Way Central hosted the New Lenox All-Star Experience presented by Mayor Tim Baldermann which included a Dwyane Wade Skills Academy camp, a Devin Hester football camp, a Jim Peterik band camp, as well as the Annual Kids Fest.

Semi-pro football

The Lincoln-Way Patriots are part of the Mid States Football League and play throughout the Lincoln-Way area.

Parks and trails

The New Lenox Community Park District maintains 40 parks and athletic fields comprising nearly 600 acres; while also utilizing 14 facilities throughout New Lenox.

New Lenox also offers a number of paved asphalt and crushed gravel trails. Old Plank Road Trail is a 22-mile pavement hiking and biking nature trail that travels through the heart of New Lenox with many access points to include access at the Village Hall in the Commons.  The Hickory Creek State Nature Preserve provides a 2.8-mile asphalt hiking and biking nature trail as well as access to the historic one-room Schmuhl School Museum on the southeast corner of Route 30 and Schoolhouse Road, which is owned and operated by the New Lenox Historical Society. Additionally, the Hadley Valley Preserve offers a unique 4.85-mile crushed Spring Creek Greenway Trail that welcomes pedestrians and equestrians.

Notable people 
 

 B.J. Bello, NFL linebacker, for the Los Angeles Chargers
 Alex Broadhurst, former NHL center for the Columbus Blue Jackets 
 Karla DeVito, singer/songwriter
 Tony Cingrani, MLB pitcher, currently playing for the St. Louis Cardinals 
 Ned Grabavoy, former MLS player and current scouting director for Portland Timbers, 2009 MLS Cup winner
 Sonya Huber, writer
 Renée Kosel, state Congresswomen representing Illinois 81st legislative district
 Rob Ninkovich, retired defensive end and two-time Super Bowl champion for the New England Patriots. Current analyst for ESPN. 
 Johan Reinhard, Andean archeologist and explorer in residence for National Geographic
 Wellington J. Reynolds, painter, instructor at Art Institute of Chicago
 Eric Steinbach, offensive lineman, retired NFL football player

Local media
New Lenox's weekly community newspaper is The New Lenox Patriot.

References

External links

 Village of New Lenox
 

Villages in Illinois
Villages in Will County, Illinois
Populated places established in 1946
1946 establishments in Illinois